Khagwani is a town in Hazro Tehsil of Attock District in Punjab Province of Pakistan.

Community
According to the recent survey the population is 10,000. The population is Muslim and speak Hindko. The weather is generally mild. Most residents work in agriculture. Public transportation is the primary mode of travel.
Pashtuns, Awans, and Bukharis, Arians, are the main tribes of this village. The professions of mostly peoples are agriculture while a numbers of peoples work in foreign countries.  A dhoke gharbi is a populated area of caste Arians.

References

Cities and towns in Attock District